Stenton station is a SEPTA Regional Rail station at 529-599 Vernon Road between Ardleigh and Blakemore Streets in Philadelphia, Pennsylvania.

The station is in zone 2 on the Chestnut Hill East Line, on former Reading Railroad tracks, and is 8.6 track miles from Suburban Station. In 2013, this station saw 430 boardings and 124 alightings on an average weekday.

Station layout

References

External links
SEPTA - Stenton Station
Station image
 Station House from Google Maps Street View

SEPTA Regional Rail stations